Cherok Paloh is a village in Pekan District, Pahang, Malaysia. It is situated about 38 kilometer south from Kuantan town and 14 kilometer north of downtown Pekan. Cherok Paloh is famous as a fishing area and coconut tree cultivation done by the locals. Local residents also do a livestock farming such as cows, buffalo, goat and horse.

References

Populated places in Pahang
Villages in Pahang